Kadesh or Qadesh or Cades (in classical Hebrew , from the root  "holy") is a place-name that occurs several times in the Hebrew Bible, describing a site or sites located south of, or at the southern border of, Canaan and the Kingdom of Judah in the kingdom of Israel. Many modern academics hold that it was a single site, located at the modern Tel el-Qudeirat, while some academics and rabbinical authorities hold that there were two locations named Kadesh. A related term, either synonymous with Kadesh or referring to one of the two sites, is Kadesh (or Qadesh) Barnea. Various etymologies for Barnea have been proposed, including 'desert of wanderings,' but none have produced widespread agreement.

The Bible mentions Kadesh and/or Kadesh Barnea in a number of episodes, making it an important site (or sites) in narratives concerning Israelite origins. Kadesh was the chief site of encampment for the Israelites during their wandering in the Zin Desert (Deuteronomy 1:46), as well as the place from which the Israelite spies were sent to Canaan (Numbers 13:1-26). The first failed attempt to capture Canaan was made from Kadesh. Moses struck a rock (rather than speaking to it as the Lord commanded) that brought forth water at Kadesh. Miriam and Aaron both died and were buried near a place named Kadesh, while their sister Miriam had died in Kadesh prior (numbers 20:1). Moses sent envoys to the King of Edom from Kadesh, asking for permission to let the Israelites use the King's Highway passing through his territory, which the Edomite king denied.

Kadesh Barnea is a key feature in the common biblical formula delineating the southern border of the Land of Israel (cf.

Biblical references
  "And they turned back, and came to En-mishpat--the same is Kadesh--and smote all the country of the Amalekites, and also the Amorites, that dwelt in Hazazon-tamar."
  "Wherefore the well was called 'Beer-lahai-roi; behold, it is between Kadesh and Bered."
  "And Abraham journeyed from thence toward the land of the South, and dwelt between Kadesh and Shur; and he sojourned in Gerar."
  "And they went and came to Moses, and to Aaron, and to all the congregation of the children of Israel, unto the wilderness of Paran, to Kadesh; and brought back word unto them, and unto all the congregation, and showed them the fruit of the land."
  "And the children of Israel, even the whole congregation, came into the wilderness of Zin in the first month; and the people abode in Kadesh; and Miriam died there, and was buried there."
 -16 "And Moses sent messengers from Kadesh unto the king of Edom: 'Thus saith thy brother Israel: Thou knowest all the travail that hath befallen us; how our fathers went down into Egypt, and we dwelt in Egypt a long time; and the Egyptians dealt ill with us, and our fathers; and when we cried unto the LORD, He heard our voice, and sent a messenger, and brought us forth out of Egypt; and, behold, we are in Kadesh, a city in the uttermost of thy border."
  "And they journeyed from Kadesh; and the children of Israel, even the whole congregation, came unto mount Hor."
 -14 "And when thou hast seen it, thou also shalt be gathered unto thy people, as Aaron thy brother was gathered; because ye rebelled against My commandment in the wilderness of Zin, in the strife of the congregation, to sanctify Me at the waters before their eyes.'--These are the waters of Meribath-kadesh in the wilderness of Zin."
 -37 "And they journeyed from Ezion-geber, and pitched in the wilderness of Zin--the same is Kadesh. And they journeyed from Kadesh, and pitched in mount Hor, in the edge of the land of Edom."
  "So ye abode in Kadesh many days, according unto the days that ye abode there."
  "Because ye trespassed against Me in the midst of the children of Israel at the waters of Meribath-kadesh, in the wilderness of Zin; because ye sanctified Me not in the midst of the children of Israel."
 -17 "But when they came up from Egypt, and Israel walked through the wilderness unto the Red Sea, and came to Kadesh; then Israel sent messengers unto the king of Edom, saying: Let me, I pray thee, pass through thy land; but the king of Edom hearkened not. And in like manner he sent unto the king of Moab; but he would not; and Israel abode in Kadesh."
  "The voice of the LORD shaketh the wilderness; the LORD shaketh the wilderness of Kadesh."
  "And the south side southward shall be from Tamar as far as the waters of Meriboth-kadesh, to the Brook, unto the Great Sea. This is the south side southward."
  "And by the border of Gad, at the south side southward, the border shall be even from Tamar unto the waters of Meribath-kadesh, to the Brook, unto the Great Sea."

Location
The most common identification of Kadesh or Kadesh Barnea in modern scholarship is with the present-day Tell el-Qudeirat, with most contemporary scholars seeing the biblical references to Kadesh as referring to a single site.

The Bible locates Kadesh, or Kadesh Barnea, as an oasis south of Canaan, west of the Aravah and east of the Brook of Egypt. It is 11 days' march by way of Mount Seir from Horeb (Deuteronomy 1:2).

By the late nineteenth century, as many as eighteen sites had been proposed for biblical Kadesh. One source of confusion has been the fact that Kadesh is sometimes mentioned in connection with the Desert of Paran (Numbers 13:26) and at other times with the Zin Desert (Numbers 20:1). This discrepancy has been noted by commentators as early as the Middle Ages. Some (e.g., Hezekiah ben Manoah) sought a reconciliatory model, while others (Abraham ibn Ezra and Nahmanides) proposed two separate sites named Kadesh.

A minority of recent scholars have continued to maintain a two-site theory, with a western Kadesh in the wilderness of Zin, and an eastern Kadesh in the wilderness of Paran, the latter often associated with Petra, Jordan. The two-site theory also appears to have been held by Josephus and Eusebius of Caesarea. Josephus identifies Miriam's burial site (which the Bible identifies as Kadesh) with Petra, which he called Rekem.

After a period in which researchers identified Kadesh with the similarly named Ein Qedeis, since 1905 modern Ain-el-Qudeirat in Wadi el-Ain of northern Sinai has been widely accepted as the location of Kadesh Barnea. Several Iron Age fortresses have been excavated there. The oldest, a small elliptical structure, dates to the tenth century BCE, and was abandoned for some time after its first destruction. A second fort, constructed during the eighth century BCE (probably during the reign of Uzziah) was destroyed during the seventh century BCE, most likely during Manasseh of Judah's reign. Two ostraca engraved in Hebrew, dated to the 8th or 7th century BCE, have been recovered there, suggesting Israelite occupation.

Archaeological excavations
Excavations at Ain el-Qudeirat conducted by Dr. Rudolph Cohen, former head of the Israeli Antiquities Authority during the Israeli occupation of Sinai following the 1967 war uncovered copious remains of the Middle Bronze Age I period (MBA I or MBI, sometimes known as the Intermediate Bronze Age), which were also found at numerous other sites in the Negev. On the other hand, Late Bronze Age, the conventional time of the Exodus, was unattested in the Negev, although more recent reevaluations of the archaeological findings indicate that the site was probably occupied from at least the 12th century BCE. In an article in Biblical Archaeology Review of July, 1983, Cohen put forward the suggestion that the Exodus took place at the start of MBI and that the MBI people were, in fact, the Israelites. The idea has not been widely adopted.

See also
 Nitzanei Sinai, also known as Kadesh Barnea, a community settlement in the Negev desert of modern-day Israel

References

Torah cities